Laddu or laddoo is a deep-fried spherical sweet from the Indian subcontinent made of various ingredients and sugar syrup or jaggery. It has been described as "perhaps the most universal and ancient of Indian sweets."

Laddus are often served during celebrations and religious festivals, especially those associated with the Hindu deity Ganesha.

History 

Archaeological excavations have found "food balls" made of legumes and cereals such as barley, wheat, chickpea and mung bean were consumed in the Indus Valley Civilization circa 2600 BCE.

In the 3rd-4th century Sanskrit medical book Sushruta Samhita, ladduka are described as small balls of jaggery, peanuts, and sesame seeds coated with honey. These balls were used as an antiseptic and to deliver medication. However, the first documented mention of laddu as a sweet is in the  11th-century Western Indian cookbook Lokopakara.

Varieties

Besan laddu

Besan laddu is the most common variety. To prepare it, besan (chickpea flour) is fried in hot ghee (clarified butter). Sugar and cardamom powder are then mixed in. The mixture is formed into balls and allowed to cool and solidify. The version served in the Venkateswara Temple in Tirupati, India, has been called "the most famous temple laddu."

Motichoor laddu

Motichoor ("crushed pearls" in Hindi) laddu  is made from boondi, tiny fried balls of chickpea batter soaked in sugar syrup.

Coconut laddu 

There are multiple coconut laddu recipes. Its earliest form Narayl Nakru dates back to the time of the Chola Empire, when it was a sweet that was packed for travelers and warriors as a symbol of good luck for their expeditions.

Semolina or rava laddu
This is a laddu prepared from rava (semolina), sugar and ghee. A variant on the recipe includes khoa cheese as an additional ingredient.

Laddu with edible gum
In India, these are traditionally given to lactating mothers as they help in the production of milk. These laddus are called dinkache ladoo in Marathi and gond ka laddu in Hindi. The main ingredient is gum arabic which is collected from the babhul tree. Other ingredients include coconut, almonds, cashews, dates, spices such as nutmeg and cardamom, poppy seeds, ghee, and sugar.

An alternative multigrain recipe will have a portion of gum replaced by grains and legume flours such as besan, urid, ragi (nachani in Marathi) and wheat.

Others
In Rajasthan, laddus are made from wheat flour, in Maharashtra from sesame seeds, in Kerala from rice flour, and in Andhra Pradesh from rice flakes. Optional ingredients include grated coconut, roasted chickpeas, nuts, and raisins.

World record

The largest individual laddu weighs  and was achieved by PVVS Mallikharjuna Rao (India), in Tapeswaram, Andhra Pradesh, India, on 6 September 2016. The laddu was made to a traditional Boondi recipe. The ingredients included ghee, refined oil, cashew nuts, sugar, almonds, cardamom, and water.

In popular culture

In the Sesame Street episode "Rakhi Road", laddus are featured prominently as a favored Indian dessert. Elmo is shown making laddus and enjoying eating them as part of the celebrations around the Indian festival of Rakhi.

A laddu weighing 6,300 kg was made for a Ganesh festival in Andhra Pradesh, India in September 2012. This was claimed to be the largest known laddu.

In the movie English Vinglish, the protagonist Shashi Godbole (Sridevi) is a housewife who makes and sells laddoos for a living.

The Netflix series Mighty Little Bheem features laddus on several episodes.

See also
 Tirupati Laddu
 Khanom kho
 Indian sweets

References

Bangladeshi desserts
Bengali cuisine
Bihari cuisine
Bruneian snack foods
Burmese cuisine
Burmese desserts and snacks
Chickpea dishes
Kue
Indian pastries
Malay cuisine
Malaysian snack foods
Nepalese cuisine
Pakistani desserts
Singaporean cuisine
Thai desserts and snacks
Uttar Pradeshi cuisine
Vegetarian dishes of India